A candy bar is a type of candy that is in the shape of a bar. The most common type of candy bar is the chocolate bar, including both bars made of solid chocolate and combination candy bars, which are candy bars that combine chocolate with other ingredients, such as nuts, caramel, nougat, or wafers. 

Many varieties of candy bars exist, and many are mass-produced. Between World War I and the middle of the 20th century, approximately 40,000 brands of candy bars were introduced.

Chocolate bars

A chocolate bar is a bar-shaped piece of chocolate, which may also contain layerings or mixtures of other ingredients. A wide variety of chocolate bar brands are sold. A popular example is a Snickers bar, which consists of nougat mixed with caramel and peanuts. 

The first solid chocolate bar was produced by Fry's of Bristol, England in 1847.  Fry's Chocolate Cream became the first mass-produced chocolate bar in 1866. The Goo Goo Cluster was the first mass-produced combination bar, including marshmallow, nougat, caramel, and roasted peanuts. In some varieties of English and food labeling standards, the term chocolate bar is reserved for bars of solid chocolate, with candy bar used for products with additional ingredients.

Non-chocolate bars

Candy bars containing no chocolate include:

 Abba-Zaba: taffy with a peanut butter center
 AirHeads: a taffy based candy that comes in multiple flavours
 Big Hunk: nougat center covered with peanuts
 Bit-O-Honey: honey-flavored taffy with almond bits
 Cajeta Elegancita: caramel center covered with goat's milk
 Carambar: caramel-based candy
 Caramac: caramel-based candy
 Chick-O-Stick: peanut butter center covered with coconut
 Choo Choo Bar: liquorice-based candy
 Hershey's Cookies 'n' Mint: mint-flavored Hershey candy bar with mint-flavored cookie bits
 Hershey's Gold: caramel-flavored Hershey candy bar with peanuts and pretzels
 Kendal Mint Cake: peppermint-based candy
 Laffy Taffy: a taffy based candy that comes in multiple flavours
 Mantecol: a peanut butter nougat bar
 Mr. Tom: peanuts and caramel
 Munch: peanut brittle-like candy
 PayDay: peanuts and caramel
 Pecan log roll: cherry-laced nougat center covered with caramel and pecans
 Planters Peanut Bar: peanut brittle-like candy
 Salted Nut Roll: nougat center covered with caramel and peanuts
 Turkish Taffy: taffy-based candy
 Wazoo: taffy center covered with sprinkles
 Yeot-gangjeong: hangwa center covered in toasted seeds, nuts, beans or puffed grains mixed with mullyeot (rice syrup)
 Zagnut: peanut brittle wrapped in toasted coconut

See also

 Candy making
 Dessert bar – a type of American "bar cookie"
 Energy bar
 Granola bar
 List of candies
 List of chocolate bar brands
 Yeot-gangjeong

References

Further reading
 Cadbury, Deborah, Chocolate Wars: The 150-Year Rivalry Between the World's Greatest Chocolate Makers (PublicAffairs, 2011)
 Mazze, Edward M. and Michman, Ronald D., The Food Industry Wars: Marketing Triumphs and Blunders (Praeger, 1998)

External links
 

 
Confectionery